The Boeing Model 853 Quiet Bird was a US Army scout plane study developed by Boeing in the early 1960s.

Design and development

Development of the Model 853 began in 1962 at Boeing Wichita, only a 1/2 scale prototype was produced which never flew, but tests showed that it had a very low radar cross-section (stealth aircraft).

Specifications

See also

References

External links 

Stealth aircraft
1960s United States experimental aircraft
Boeing military aircraft